Phanaeus is a genus of Scarabaeidae or scarab beetles in the superfamily Scarabaeoidea.

Species
 Phanaeus achilles
 Phanaeus adonis
 Phanaeus alvarengai
 Phanaeus amethystinus
 Phanaeus amithaon
 Phanaeus beltianus
 Phanaeus bispinus
 Phanaeus blackalleri
 Phanaeus bordoni
 Phanaeus cambeforti
 Phanaeus chalcomelas
 Phanaeus changdiazi
 Phanaeus damocles
 Phanaeus daphnis
 Phanaeus dejeani
 Phanaeus demon
 Phanaeus difformis
 Phanaeus dionysius
 Phanaeus dzidoi
 Phanaeus endymion
 Phanaeus eximius
 Phanaeus flohri
 Phanaeus furiosus
 Phanaeus genieri
 Phanaeus halffterorum
 Phanaeus haroldi
 Phanaeus hermes
 Phanaeus howdeni
 Phanaeus igneus
 Phanaeus kirbyi
 Phanaeus labreae
 Phanaeus lecourti
 Phanaeus lunaris
 Phanaeus malyi
 Phanaeus martinezorum
 Phanaeus melampus
 Phanaeus meleagris
 Phanaeus melibaeus
 Phanaeus mexicanus
 Phanaeus nimrod
 Phanaeus palaeno
 Phanaeus palliatus
 Phanaeus prasinus
 Phanaeus pyrois
 Phanaeus quadridens
 Phanaeus sallei
 Phanaeus scutifer
 Phanaeus splendidulus
 Phanaeus triangularis
 Phanaeus tridens
 Phanaeus wagneri
 Phanaeus vindex
 Phanaeus viridicollis
 Phanaeus yecoraensis
 Phanaeus zapotecus

References